St Columba's High School may refer to:
is a school

 St Columba's High School, Gourock in Inverclyde, Scotland, United Kingdom
 St Columba's Catholic College in Australia